Datebook may refer to:

Diary (stationery), or appointment book
Datebook, a 1960s American teen magazine noted for publishing a controversial interview with the Beatles
Datebook, an application on Palm OS